Amr El-Bayoumi (born 1965), is an Egyptian-American actor and voice artist. He is best known for the roles in the films Captain Phillips, The Fifth Estate and Psychosis.

Personal life
He was born in 1965 in Alexandria, Egypt. He completed primary education from Bailey Elementary School in East Lansing, Michigan. He is currently based on Washington DC and New York City. After graduating with a degree in law, he moved to Los Angeles and assigned to L.A. as a chemical engineer.

Career
He has performed in several productions in the US, England, and Egypt. In 2008, he starred in the short film 11 Missed Calls which opened him to show his talents. Then in 2009, he was selected for another short NASA and the Space Pen as 'narrator'. After two more shorts: The Drift and Loose End, El-Bayoumi made his feature film debut with 2013 film The Fifth Estate. In the film, he played a supportive role as 'General'. In late 2013, he was able to appear in the American blockbuster Captain Phillips as a crew member of Maersk Alabama.

He appeared in several popular American television serials in the recent past which include: House of Cards, Mr. Robot, The Blacklist, Madam Secretary, Quantico and Person of Interest.

Filmography

See also
 List of LGBT-related films of 2007

References

External links
 

Living people
American people of Egyptian descent
1965 births
American television actors
21st-century American actors